Villeneuve-en-Retz is a commune in the department of Loire-Atlantique, western France. The municipality was established on 1 January 2016 by merger of the former communes of Bourgneuf-en-Retz and Fresnay-en-Retz.

See also 
Communes of the Loire-Atlantique department

References 

Communes of Loire-Atlantique
Populated places established in 2016
2016 establishments in France
Pornic Agglo Pays de Retz